Pedro Fernando Mavunza is the ambassador of Angola to Botswana and the Congo.

Ambassador Pedro Fernando Mavunza succeeded Manuel Quarta Punza upon his death on October 12, 2007 as ambassador to the Congo Brazzaville.

References

Angolan diplomats
Living people
Year of birth missing (living people)
Ambassadors of Angola to South Africa
Ambassadors of Angola to the Republic of the Congo